Komala may refer to:

 Komala (Pokémon), a Gen VII Normal-type Pokémon species introduced in Pokémon Sun and Moon
 Komala Party of Iranian Kurdistan, a Kurdish political party led by Abdullah Mohtadi
 Komalah (CPI), a Kurdish political party led by Ibrahim Alizade
 Komalapuram, a census town in Alappuzha district in Kerala

People with the name Komala
 A. P. Komala (born 1934), South Indian playback singer
 Komala Dewi (born 1989), Indonesian badminton player
 Komala Saovamala (1887–1890), Princess of Siam
 Komala Varadan, Indian classical dancer

See also
Kamala (disambiguation)
Komla, given name